Benjamin Patrick Aris (16 March 1937 – 4 September 2003) was an English actor who was best known for his parts in Hi-de-Hi! and To the Manor Born, and was also very active on stage. He was often cast as an eccentric, upper-class or upper-middle class man.

Early career
Aris was born in London, and following the Second World War, he trained at the Arts Educational School. At the age of 16, he joined a national tour of the show Zip Goes a Million. He then did his national service in the Army and after that appeared in many musicals and films including The Plague of the Zombies, The Charge of the Light Brigade and if.....
On stage, Aris was in the 1960 production of the revue "One Over The Eight" at the Duke of York's Theatre in London.
He also appeared in Tony Richardson's 1969 production of "Hamlet" at London's Roundhouse, its New York transfer to the Lunt-Fontanne Theatre, and also its film version the same year.

Film and television career
His first television role was in the children's series Jamie in 1971. He also appeared in Invasion of the Dinosaurs, a 1974 Doctor Who serial. His other early television roles included Some Mothers Do 'Ave 'Em, Sam and the River (1975), Crown Court, Wodehouse Playhouse and Target. During that time he also appeared in the films Get Carter, The Three Musketeers, Digby, the Biggest Dog in the World and Juggernaut. He also worked several times for director Ken Russell, in films The Music Lovers, Savage Messiah, and  Tommy, and in TV's The Rime of the Ancient Mariner and Lady Chatterley.

For three episodes, from 1980 to 1981, he played Mr Spalding in To the Manor Born, and then in 1983, he portrayed Edmund Waller, one of Tom Lacey's friends at the court of Charles I, in By the Sword Divided. In 1984, he made his first appearance in Hi-de-Hi! as Julian Dalrymple-Sykes, a dancer. He became a regular in 1986 and played the part until the show's end in 1988. He also starred in Bergerac, Agatha Christie's Poirot, You Rang, M'Lord? and Boon. As well as acting with Penelope Keith in To the Manor Born, he also appeared with her in Executive Stress and No Job for a Lady.

Later years
One of the most memorable stage performances was in the West End playing Geoffrey in Stepping Out by Richard Harris. His final stage appearance was in The Lady in the Van by Alan Bennett, opposite Dame Maggie Smith. His final TV appearance was in the 2002 drama Ready. He died in Surrey in 2003 aged 66.  His son Jonathan Aris followed him into acting.

Selected filmography

 Tom Brown's Schooldays (1951) - Tadpole (uncredited)
 The Plague of the Zombies (1966) - John Martinus
 The Mini-Affair (1967) - TV Producer
 The Charge of the Light Brigade (1968) - Lt. Maxse
 if.... (1968) - John Thomas: Staff
 Lionheart (1968) - Capt. Harris
 Hamlet (1969) - Rosencrantz
 Say Hello to Yesterday (1971) - Floor Walker (uncredited)
 The Music Lovers (1970) - Young Lieutenant
 Get Carter (1971) - Architect #2
 Savage Messiah (1972) - Thomas Buff
 O Lucky Man! (1973) - Mr. MacIntyre / Dr. Hyder / Flight Lt. Wallace
 Digby, the Biggest Dog in the World (1973) - Army Captain
 The Three Musketeers (1973) - 1st Musketeer
 Juggernaut (1974) - The Walker
 Vampira (1974) - Policeman
 Smokey Joe's Revenge (1974) - Mr. Fawcett
 Alfie Darling (1975) - Advertising Man
 Tommy (1975) - Reverend Simpson
 Royal Flash (1975) - Fireman
 I'm Not Feeling Myself Tonight (1976) - Trampas B. Hildebrand
 The Ritz (1976) - Patron With Bicycle
 Voyage of the Damned (1976) - German Jewish Passenger (uncredited)
 Sir Henry at Rawlinson End (1980) - Lord Tarquin of Staines
 Night Train to Murder (1983, TV Movie) - Theatre Manager
 King of the Wind (1990) - Squire Dunn
 U.F.O. (1993) - Doctor
 Up at the Villa (2000) - Col. Trail
 Relative Values (2000) - (uncredited)
 Undertaker's Paradise (2000)

References

External links

1937 births
2003 deaths
People educated at the Arts Educational Schools
English male film actors
English male stage actors
English male television actors
Male actors from London